MUNICH MODELS GmbH is a modeling agency based in Munich, Germany. Founded in 1992 by Susanne Maushake, the agency represents female models for editorial and commercial modelling.

Models represented (present)
Munich Models represented by the agency include:

See also
 List of modeling agencies

Notes and references

External links
Official Website

Modeling agencies
Entertainment companies established in 1992
Companies based in Munich